Dr. Ahmed Jamsheed Mohamed, born in Fuvahmulah, Maldives was the former Health Minister of the Maldives under the presidency of Dr. Mohamed Waheed Hassan Manik. He has studied in Tribhuvan University Health Department of Nepal.

Dr. Jamsheed was the CEO of ADK Hospital and Director General of CDC Maldives and the Regional Advisor to World Health Organization (WHO), South-East Asia Region (SEARO), and the Deputy WHO Representative (WR) to WHO Bangladesh at present.

References

Government ministers of the Maldives
World Health Organization
Year of birth missing (living people)
Maldivian medical doctors
Living people